The men's 50m backstroke S1 event at the 2008 Summer Paralympics took place at the Beijing National Aquatics Center on 15 September. There were no heats in this event.

Final

Competed at 17:00.

References
 
 

Swimming at the 2008 Summer Paralympics